Films produced in Sri Lanka in the 2000s (decade).

2000

2001

2002

2003

2004

2005

2006

2007

2008

2009

See also
 Cinema of Sri Lanka
 List of Sri Lankan films

1990s
Films
Sri Lanka